Origins of names of cities and towns in Hong Kong

See also

Place names of Hong Kong